The British South Africa Company appointed a variety of officials to govern Southern Rhodesia (called Zimbabwe since 1980) between 1890 and 1923. The most prominent of these were the Administrator and the Chief Magistrate, the first of which was in effect the head of government during this time. As such, he held a seat on the Legislative Council of Southern Rhodesia ex officio.

The post of Administrator was officially created by section 8 of the Southern Rhodesia Order in Council of 1894, but in practice had existed as a deputy to the Chief Magistrate, who was the principal officer from 1890. The term of office was theoretically three years, though it was common to reappoint incumbents. There was, in addition, an Acting Administrator, who was a deputy.

The Administrator office became defunct when Southern Rhodesia received responsible government within the British Empire in October 1923. It was replaced by the post of Premier, which was renamed Prime Minister in 1933.

Chief Magistrates of Southern Rhodesia

 24 July 1891 – 18 September 1891: A. R. Colquhoun (acting)
 18 September 1891 – 7 October 1893: Dr Leander Starr Jameson KCMG, CB
 7 October 1893 – 10 September 1894: A. H. F. Duncan (acting)

Administrators of Southern Rhodesia

 1 October 1890 – 10 September 1894: A. R. Colquhoun
 10 September 1894 – 2 April 1896: Dr Leander Starr Jameson KCMG, CB
 2 April 1896 – 5 December 1898: Earl Grey
 5 December 1898 – 20 December 1901: William Henry Milton (Administrator of Mashonaland and Senior Administrator of Southern Rhodesia)
 5 December 1898 – March 1901: Hon. Arthur Lawley (Administrator of Matabeleland)
 20 December 1901 – 1 November 1914: Sir William Henry Milton 
 1 November 1914 – 1 September 1923: Sir Francis Chaplin

Acting Administrators of Southern Rhodesia
 1894 – 1895: Colonel Francis Rhodes
 1895 – 1897: Mr Justice Joseph Vintcent
 1897 – 1898: William Henry Milton
 1898 – 1899: Hon. Sir Thomas Charles Scanlen
 1899 – 1902: Hon. Arthur Lawley (Mashonaland)
 1902 – 1903: John Gilbert Kotzé
 1903 – 1903: Hon. Sir Thomas Charles Scanlen
 1903 – 1904: John Gilbert Kotzé
 1904 – 1909: Hon. Sir Thomas Charles Scanlen
 1909 – 1914: Francis James Newton
 1914 – 1923: Sir Clarkson Henry Tredgold, Sir Ernest William Sanders Montagu, and P. D. L. Fynn at various times.

Resident Commissioner
After the Jameson Raid, the British Imperial Government determined by order in council to appoint a Resident Commissioner to supervise the affairs of the British South Africa Company. Reporting to the High Commissioner for Southern Africa, who in turn reported to the Colonial Office in London, the resident commissioner's function was to protect African interests and to prevent the company from inducing another expensive rebellion.
 5 December 1898 – 1 April 1905: Sir Marshal James Clarke
 1 April 1905 – 1 April 1908: Richard Chester-Master
 1 April 1908 – 1 April 1911: James George Fair
 1 April 1911 – 1 April 1915: Robert Burns-Begg
 1 April 1915 – 1 April 1918: Herbert James Stanley
 1 April 1918 – 1 October 1923: Crawford Douglas Douglas-Jones

References

 Holders of Administrative and Ministerial Office 1894-1964 by F.M.G. Willson and G.C. Passmore, assisted by Margaret T. Mitchell (Source Book No. 3, Department of Government, University College of Rhodesia and Nyasaland, Salisbury 1966)

Bibliography

Southern Rhodesia Administrators
British South Africa Company
Politics of Southern Rhodesia before 1923
Rhodesia-related lists